Moises or Moisés is a male name common among people of Iberian origin. It is the Spanish, Portuguese  and Tagalog equivalent of the name Moses.

Places
 Doctor Moisés Bertoni, a village in the Caazapá department of Paraguay
 Moises Padilla, a municipality in the Negros Occidental province of the Philippines
 Moisés Ville, a township in the Santa Fe province of Argentina

Buildings
 Estádio Moisés Lucarelli, a football stadium in São Paulo, Brazil
 Moisés Benzaquén Rengifo Airport, serving Yurimaguas, Loreto, Peru
 Moisés E. Molina High School, in Western Park, Oak Cliff Dallas, Texas, United States

Other
 Un Amor en Moisés Ville, a 2001 Argentine drama film.

Notable people

 Moisés Aldape (born 1981), a Mexican professional road bicycle racer
 Moisés Alou (born 1966), a Dominican-American former outfielder in Major League Baseball
 Moisés Arias (born 1994), an American teen actor
 Moises Bicentini (1931–2007), an association football player from Curaçao
 Moisés Caicedo (born 2001), an international football player from Ecuador
 Moisés Candelario (born 1978), an international football player from Ecuador
 Moisés da Costa Amaral (1938–1989), a politician from East Timor
 Moisés Dueñas (born 1981), a Spanish road racing cyclist
 Moisés García León (born 1971), a Spanish footballer
 Moisés Giroldi (died 1989), a Panamanian military commander noted for his coup attempt against Manuel Noriega
 Moisés Henriques (born 1987), a Portuguese-Australian professional cricketer
 Moisés Hurtado (born 1981), a Spanish footballer
 Moisés Kaufman (born 1963), a Venezuelan playwright and director
 Moisés Matias de Andrade (1948–2008), a Brazilian professional football player
 Moisés Moleiro (1904–1979), a Venezuelan pianist and composer
 Moisés Moura Pinheiro (born 1979), a Brazilian footballer
 Moisés Muñoz (born 1980), a Mexican football goalkeeper
 Moisés Naím (born 1952), a Venezuelan economist, writer and columnist
 Moises Salinas (born 1966), a Mexican professor and political activist
 Moisés Santiago Bertoni (1857–1929), a Swiss botanist
 Moisés Silva (born 1945), a Cuban-American theologian
 Moisés Simons (1889–1945), a Cuban composer, pianist and orchestra leader
 Moisés Solana (1935–1969), a racing driver from Mexico
 Moises Teixeira da Silva, a Brazilian criminal and escaped convict
 Moisés Torrealba (born 1978), a Venezuelan folk musician.
 Moisés Tuʻu Hereveri (c. 1873–1925), a Rapa Nui leader
 Moisés Valle (born 1965), also known as "Yumurí", a Cuban musician
 Moisés Velasco (born 1989), a Mexican football midfielder
 Moisés Villarroel (born 1976), a Chilean football midfielder
 Moisés Wolfenson, a former Peruvian Congressman